Christian Falk (born 1 April 1987) is an Austrian footballer who currently plays as a striker.

Career

Club career
Before Falk moved to TSV Hartberg, he played for USV Großsteinbach. In the 2004/05 season he was the top scorer in the Gebietsliga Ost, with 27 goals and helped the team with promotion to the Unterliga Ost. With this achievement, TSV Hartberg became aware of him. The 194 centimeter tall striker then began his professional career in 2005 at TSV Hartberg. In 2008 he played briefly at SV Bad Aussee before he moved to Vöcklabrucker SC. From July 2009 he was under contract with Austrian Football Bundesliga club Wolfsberger AC.

For the 2014/15 season, Falk moved to FC Rot-Weiß Erfurt. There he was unable to assert himself and scored no goals in 20 appearances. In the 2015/16 season he moved to the Austrian Football Second League team SK Austria Klagenfurt. He scored in his first competitive game against FC Liefering (final score 4-0).

In August 2016 he moved to FC Blau-Weiß Linz, with whom he received a contract valid until June 2017. For the 2017/18 season he moved to ASK Voitsberg. In August 2018, he then joined UFC Fehring.

References

External links
 
 Christian Falk at ÖFB

1987 births
Living people
Austrian footballers
Austrian expatriate footballers
Association football forwards
TSV Hartberg players
SV Bad Aussee players
FC Rot-Weiß Erfurt players
FC Blau-Weiß Linz players
Wolfsberger AC players
SK Austria Klagenfurt players
Austrian Football Bundesliga players
2. Liga (Austria) players
3. Liga players
Austrian expatriate sportspeople in Germany
Expatriate footballers in Germany